James Farquhar (born c. 1879) was a Scottish footballer who played for Sunderland as a half back.

Club career
He made his Sunderland debut on 18 February 1899 against Sheffield Wednesday in a 1–0 win at Olive Grove. He was a part of the Sunderland team that won the 1902 English Football League Championship. Overall, at his time at the club, he made 188 league appearances scoring 18 goals.

References
James Farquhar's careers stats at The Stat Cat

1870s births
20th-century deaths
Year of birth uncertain
Year of death missing
Scottish footballers
Sunderland A.F.C. players
Association football wing halves